Ognon Lock is a double chamber lock on the Canal du Midi in the Aude region of  Languedoc, France. The adjacent locks are Pechlaurier Lock 2726 metres to the east and Homps Lock 689 metres to the west.

See also
Locks on the Canal du Midi

Locks on the Canal du Midi